Flavobacterium banpakuense  is a Gram-negative, strictly aerobic, non-spore-forming and motile bacterium from the genus of Flavobacterium which has been isolated from compost.

References

External links
Type strain of Flavobacterium banpakuense at BacDive -  the Bacterial Diversity Metadatabase

 

banpakuense
Bacteria described in 2011